Blaxland railway station is located on the Main Western line in New South Wales, Australia. It serves the Blue Mountains suburb of Blaxland opening on 11 July 1867 as Wascoes, being renamed Blaxland on 21 April 1879.

Platforms & services
Blaxland has one island platform with two sides. It is serviced by NSW TrainLink Blue Mountains Line services travelling from Sydney Central to Lithgow.

Transport links
Blue Mountains Transit operate two routes via Blaxland station:
690P: Springwood station to Penrith station
691: Mount Riverview to Penrith station

References

External links

Blaxland station details Transport for New South Wales

Easy Access railway stations in New South Wales
Railway stations in Australia opened in 1867
Regional railway stations in New South Wales
Short-platform railway stations in New South Wales, 6 cars
Main Western railway line, New South Wales